Gytrash (foaled 28 August 2015) is a retired Australian Group 1 Thoroughbred racehorse, who was trained by Gordon Richards at Morphettville in South Australia. He is named after the legendary spirit of English folklore, the Gytrash that is said to take form of a horse, mule or dog.

Background
Gytrash was bred by Packaging Investments Australia, Haltrow and Glastonbury Farms.  He was first offered for sale as a weanling at the Great Southern Sale in 2016, where he was sold for $70,000.

"He was always a lovely type as a weanling, a big, strong chestnut just as he is now and for a Lope De Vega to make $70,000 as a weanling back then, he really did stand out in that sale," Glastonbury's Duncan Grimley said.

Gytrash was then offered at the 2017 Inglis Premier Yearling Sale where he was purchased by his trainer Gordon Richards for $40,000.

Racing career
After a number of wins at Metropolitan level, he placed 3rd in the Group 2 Euclase Stakes, prior to competing at Group 1 level in The Goodwood. He then won back to back races down the Flemington Straight, the second of which earning him his first black-type race in the Listed Creswick Stakes, and a highly credible 2nd in the Group 3 The Heath 1100, earning high regard from jockey Craig Williams.
This was followed by a short layoff to recover from a minor injury and missing the end of a spring 2019 campaign.

Gytrash resumed racing as a four-year-old after a 6-month spell in the Group 1 Black Caviar Lightning.  Starting at odds of 20/1, he won by 1 length in a race which included champion sprinters Redzel and Nature Strip.
Continuing his good Autumn form, he ran a credible 3rd in the Group 1 Newmarket Handicap carrying top weight, then delivered a 2nd place behind Loving Gaby in the Group 1 William Reid Stakes at Moonee Valley under lights with no spectators due to the start of the Coronavirus lockdowns in Australia.

Returning home to Adelaide for the Autumn Carnival, he defeated multiple Group 1 winning mare Sunlight in the Group 3 R. N. Irwin Stakes by over 3 lengths in the lead up to the Group 1 The Goodwood, in which he was narrowly beaten by Trekking and finished 2nd.

On 14 August 2020, Slot holders Inglis announced that Gytrash would be their contender in the 2020 edition of The Everest. Resuming training based at Warwick Farm in New South Wales, Gytrash then won first up, defeating Nature Strip in the Group 3 Concorde Stakes at Royal Randwick just outside of the track record.
Remaining in Sydney, Gytrash tackled The Everest worth $AUD15 Million in the Inglis slot, on 17 October 2020, and finished in 3rd place behind Classique Legend and Bivouac, after a slow start and a strong finish. Gytrash then won over 1300m at Rosehill in the Winner's Stakes (the 2020 version named in honour of Yes Yes Yes for winning the previous years The Everest).

In the 2020 World's Best Racehorse Rankings, Gytrash was rated on 118, making him the equal 80th best racehorse in the world.

After a layoff due to an operation to remove a bone chip in a knee, Gytrash resumed racing in the 2021 The Goodwood for a fast finishing 3rd, and then travelled to Queensland to compete in the Kingsford-Smith Cup where he was badly impeded in the straight and finished 12th.

Spelling in Queenland then New South Wales, Gytrash was again selected by Inglis to compete in The Everest, and commenced his preparation in The Shorts finishing 3rd.

Race record

Pedigree

References

External links 
 Gytrash's Racing Profile
 Gytrash wins the Creswick

2015 racehorse births
Racehorses bred in Australia
Racehorses trained in Australia
Thoroughbred family 4-m